Camillo Becci (died 1620) was a Roman Catholic prelate who served as Bishop of Acqui (1598–1620).

Biography
Camillo Becci was ordained a priest in the Order of Saint Augustine. On 25 November 1598, he was appointed during the papacy of Pope Clement VIII as Bishop of Acqui. On 10 January 1599, he was consecrated bishop by Gian Francesco Biandrate di San Giorgio Aldobrandini, Cardinal-Priest of San Clemente, with Giovanni Fontana, Bishop of Ferrara, and Carlo Trotti, Bishop of Bagnoregio, serving as co-consecrators. He served as Bishop of Acqui until his death in 1620. He died in 1562. While bishop, he was the principal co-consecrator of Fabrizio Verallo, Bishop of San Severo (1606), and  Vincenzo Meligne, Bishop of Ostuni.

References 

Year of birth missing
1620 deaths
Augustinian bishops
Bishops appointed by Pope Clement VIII
16th-century Italian Roman Catholic bishops